George Vraca (1896–1964) was a Romanian stage and film actor.

Selected filmography
 Life Triumphs (1951)
 The Bugler's Grandsons (1953)
 The Sun Rises (1954)

References

Bibliography 
 Goble, Alan. The Complete Index to Literary Sources in Film. Walter de Gruyter, 1999.

External links 
 

1896 births
1964 deaths
Male actors from Bucharest
Romanian male film actors
Romanian male stage actors